Kahnuj (also Romanized as Kahnūj; also known as Kahnūj-e Bālā) is a village in Fareghan Rural District, Fareghan District, Hajjiabad County, Hormozgan Province, Iran. At the 2006 census, its population was 169, in 40 families.

References 

Populated places in Hajjiabad County